Priekule Municipality is a former municipality in Courland, Latvia. The municipality was formed in 2009 by merging Bunka Parish, Virga Parish, Gramzda Parish, Kalēti Parish, Priekule Parish and Priekule town the administrative centre being Priekule. As of 2020, the population was 4,997.

Priekule Municipality ceased to exist on 1 July 2021, when it was merged into the newly-formed South Kurzeme Municipality.

See also 
 Administrative divisions of Latvia (2009)

References 

 
Former municipalities of Latvia